London North Centre (formerly known as London—Adelaide) is a federal electoral district in the city of London in the province of Ontario, Canada, that has been represented in the House of Commons of Canada since 1997.

Demographics

According to the 2021 Canada Census

Ethnic groups: 65.5% White, 8.3% South Asian, 4.6% Chinese, 3.7% Black, 3.7% Arab, 3.3% Indigenous, 2.8% Latin American, 1.7% Southeast Asian, 1.6% Korean, 1.6% Filipino, 1.5% West AsianLanguages: 68.7% English, 2.8% Mandarin, 2.6% Arabic, 2.3% Spanish, 1.3% Korean, 1.2% Malayalam, 1.1% French, 1.1% Portuguese
Religions: 46.2% Christian (19.5% Catholic, 4.6% United Church, 4.2% Anglican, 2.0% Christian Orthodox, 1.6% Presbyterian, 1.3% Baptist, 13.0% Other), 6.3% Muslim, 3.3% Hindu, 1.3% Buddhist, 39.6% None
Median income: $37,200 (2020)

Average income: $50,920 (2020)

Geography
It consists of the part of the City of London east of Wonderland Road North and Wharncliffe Road, north of Oxford Street West and the Thames River and west of Highbury Avenue North. The district includes the University of Western Ontario and University and St. Joseph's Hospitals. Wonderland Road, Oxford Street, Wharncliffe Road, and south branch of the Thames River form its western boundary with the district of London West, Highbury Avenue and the south branch of the Thames its eastern and southern boundaries with London—Fanshawe, and the north city limit its boundary with Perth—Middlesex riding to the north.

History
The riding was created in 1996 as "London—Adelaide" from parts of London East, London West and London—Middlesex ridings. It was renamed "London North Centre" in 1997.

This riding lost territory to London—Fanshawe and gained territory from London West during the 2012 electoral redistribution.

Members of Parliament

This riding has elected the following member of the House of Commons:

Election results

2008–present

2006 by-election

Long-time MP Joe Fontana resigned from the seat in 2006 in order to run in the London municipal election as a candidate for mayor, requiring a by-election to be held.

The election was called on October 22, 2006 with polling day falling on November 27.

The election result presented a major breakthrough for the Green Party, tripling its previous showing in the general election and placing slightly ahead of the candidate of the governing Conservative Party.  The vote for party leader Elizabeth May was over five times the 4.5% national popular vote in the preceding federal election.

1997–2006 general elections

^ Conservative change is from combined Canadian Alliance and Progressive Conservative totals.

^ Canadian Alliance change is from Reform

See also
 List of Canadian federal electoral districts
 Past Canadian electoral districts

References

 Parliamentary website
 Elections Canada 2006 by-election site
 2011 Results from Elections Canada
 Campaign expense data from Elections Canada

Notes

External links
 London North Centre New Democratic Party Riding Association
 London North Centre Conservative Association
 London North Centre Greens
 London North Centre Conservative Candidate Susan Truppe (Federal)

Ontario federal electoral districts
Politics of London, Ontario